"It Don't Hurt Like It Used To" is a song co-written and recorded by American country music artist Billy Currington. It was released to radio on February 8, 2016 as the third single from his 2015 album, Summer Forever. Currington wrote this song with Cary Barlowe and Shy Carter.

Background
"It Don't Hurt Like It Used To" is the only song that Currington co-wrote on his Summer Forever album.  According to Currington, he happened to visit his friends Barlowe and Carter: "Cary and I picked up guitars at the same time and played basically the same chord, and the next thing you know, we were writing the song." He said, "I remember I just started saying all the words that you hear in the beginning of the song, they just started falling out. Shy was like, ‘What was that, man?’ I said, ‘I don’t know, it’s just coming out.’ So we wrote ’em down, and then I guess within an hour the song had basically written itself."

The song is about the breakup of a relationship. According to Currington, the line "But you drug my heart through the Alabama dirt" was inspired by a past relationship.

Commercial performance
The song first entered Country Airplay at No. 59 for the chart of February 20, 2016 on its radio release.  It entered the Hot Country Songs chart at No. 49 on chart dated April 16, 2016. In October 2016, it reached No. 1 on Country Airplay, his tenth No. 1 on that chart, and it remained in that spot for two consecutive weeks.  It has sold 332,000 copies in the United States as of January 2017.

Charts

Weekly charts

Year-end charts

Certifications

References

2015 songs
2016 singles
Country ballads
2010s ballads
Billy Currington songs
Mercury Nashville singles
Songs written by Billy Currington
Songs written by Cary Barlowe
Songs written by Shy Carter
Song recordings produced by Dann Huff